Everett Virgil "Pid" Purdy (June 15, 1904 – January 16, 1951) was an American professional athlete who played in both Major League Baseball and the National Football League. He was a native of Beatrice, Nebraska, and attended Beloit College.

As a baseball player, Purdy was an outfielder who batted left-handed and threw right-handed. His professional career extended from 1923 through 1938 and much of it was spent in minor league baseball in his native Nebraska, where he toiled in the Class A Western League and the Class D Nebraska State League. He compiled a lifetime minor league batting average of .328 in 1,437 games.

Purdy also saw 181 games of Major League service with the Chicago White Sox (1926) and Cincinnati Reds (1927–1929), batting .293 with two home runs and 59 runs batted in.

Meanwhile, he played in the National Football League for the Green Bay Packers in 1926 and 1927. At 5' 6", 145 pounds, Purdy is the lightest player to ever throw a touchdown pass in the NFL. He played at the collegiate level at Beloit College.

Purdy died in his hometown of Beatrice at the age of 46.

See also
Green Bay Packers players

References

External links

1904 births
1951 deaths
Green Bay Packers players
Major League Baseball outfielders
Chicago White Sox players
Cincinnati Reds players
Beloit Buccaneers football players
Minor league baseball players
Seattle Indians players
Dallas Steers players
Indianapolis Indians players
People from Beatrice, Nebraska
Baseball players from Nebraska
Players of American football from Nebraska
Nashville Vols players